Pascola Township is an inactive township in Pemiscot County, in the U.S. state of Missouri.

Pascola Township was erected in 1900, taking its name from the community of Pascola, Missouri.

References

Townships in Missouri
Townships in Pemiscot County, Missouri